Aadhi Thaalam is a 1990 Indian Malayalam film, directed by Jayadevan and produced by K. Prasannakumar.  The film has musical score by Navas.

Cast
 Jayarekha
 Jayalalitha

Soundtrack
The music was composed by Navas and the lyrics were written by Poovachal Khader.

References

External links
 

1990 films
1990s Malayalam-language films